The 1997 Northern Arizona Lumberjacks football team was an American football team that represented Northern Arizona University (NAU) as a member of the Big Sky Conference (Big Sky) during the 1997 NCAA Division I-AA football season. In their eighth and final year under head coach Steve Axman, the Lumberjacks compiled a 6–5 record (4–4 against conference opponents), outscored opponents by a total of 302 to 261, and tied for fourth place in the Big Sky.

The team played its home games at the J. Lawrence Walkup Skydome, commonly known as the Walkup Skydome, in Flagstaff, Arizona.

The team's statistical leaders include Kino Carson with 1,099 rushing yards (including 200 yards vs. Cal State Northridge), Travis Brown with 3,395 passing yards, and Ricky Pearsall with 1,802 receiving yards.

After the season, NAU offered coach Axman a three-year contract at $82,000 per year. He rejected the deal and accepted a position as Minnesota's quarterbacks coach.

Schedule

References

Northern Arizona
Northern Arizona Lumberjacks football seasons
Northern Arizona Lumberjacks football